Zoltán Mucsi (born 8 September 1957 in Abony) is a Hungarian actor. He has appeared in more than sixty films since his debut in 1983.

Zoltán Mucsi was born in Abony, and in his childhood, he originally wanted to be a footballer. In 1979 he joined to the Szigligeti Theatre in Szolnok as assistant actor. He tried to apply to the Academy of Dramatic Art several times, unsuccessfully. From 1995 he was a freelance actor, and since 1997 he has been a member of the Bárka Theater. Later he also joined the Krétakör Theatre in 2002. His famous movie role was in Miklós Jancsó's The Lord's Lantern in Budapest (1999) as Kapa. He also appeared in movies like Sweet Emma, Dear Böbe (1992) directed by István Szabó, Kontroll (2003) directed by Nimród Antal and Tinker Tailor Soldier Spy (2011) directed by Tomas Alfredson.

Selected filmography

External links
 
 Mucsi Zoltán (port.hu)
https://snitt.hu/muveszek/mucsi-zoltan

1957 births
Living people
20th-century Hungarian male actors
21st-century Hungarian male actors
Hungarian male film actors
People from Abony